Bugsy is a 1991 film about the American gangster Bugsy Siegel.

Bugsy may also refer to:

Nickname 
 Bugsy Siegel (1906–1947), American gangster, founder and leader of Murder Inc.
 John Cunningham (Northern Ireland footballer), football coach and former player
 Martin Goldstein (1905–1941), American mobster and member of Murder Inc.
 Leo Koceski (born 1929), American collegiate football player
 Bugsy Nyskohus (born 1950), Australian former association football player Bohdan  Nyskohus
 Bryan Watson (ice hockey) (1942–2021), Canadian National Hockey League player
 Bugsy Moran, gangster

Other uses 
 Bugs Bunny, a Loony Toons character
 Bugsy McGraw (born 1945), ring name of former professional wrestler Michael Davis
 Stomy Bugsy (born 1972), stage name of French rapper Gilles Duarte
 the title character of Bugsy Malone, a 1976 musical film
 Bugsy (video game), a 1986 text-adventure game
 Bugsy (Pokémon), a character in the Pokémon universe
 Bugsy, a character portrayed by James Russo in the 1984 film Once Upon a Time in America
 "Bugsy", an obsolete synonym for "crazy"

See also 
 
 Bugs (disambiguation)
 Bugs (nickname)

Lists of people by nickname